Pōkeno is a small town in the Waikato District of the Waikato region in New Zealand,  southeast of Auckland,  from Tuakau and  from Mercer. State Highway 1 originally ran through the town, but the upgrading of the highway in 1992 to expressway standards mean that the town has been bypassed.

History
The town is named for the Ngāti Tamaoho settlement in the area called Pokino, located to the northwest of the current town centre. A military installation, Pokino Camp, was set up in the area in December 1861 after Governor George Edward Grey called for a road to be completed from Drury to the Waikato River, Great South Road. In mid-1862, work began on Queen's Redoubt, a military base which would become General Cameron's base of operations for the Invasion of the Waikato, housing 450 soldiers. The Māori village of Pokino to the north of Queen's Redoubt was deserted in July 1863 just prior to the start of the invasion (officially the village was listed as abandoned, though likely it had been ransacked by unauthorised soldiers). Queen's Redoubt was abandoned for military use in March 1867, with the buildings of the redoubt sold off by auction soon after.

The Pokeno Railway Station on the Waikato section of the North Island Main Trunk line was opened in 1875, but was closed in 1973 to passengers and in 1980 to goods. Work on the proposed Paeroa–Pokeno Line commenced in 1938 and whilst approximately 13 km of earthworks were completed at each end, the proposal was halted due to World War 2 and was not resumed following the war and was abandoned.

Havelock 
In 1859 over 60 sections were put up for sale under the Auckland Waste Land Act 1858. After the sale it was reported "Thirty one lots in the village of Havelock, which has recently been laid out on the banks of the Waikato river, were in much request, the lots averaged from half an acre to an acre and 38 perches, and the whole fetched £339." Havelock and nearby Bluff Stockade were shown on an 1864 map. The planned roads and subdivisions are still shown on modern cadastral maps, though the plans for the township to become the capital of the Waikato came to nothing when the Great South Road was diverted to the east. In 2019 permission was sought to revive the subdivision in TaTa Valley, with 1,025 houses, a conference hotel, farm park and a ferry to Mercer.

Bluff Stockade 
At the end of Bluff Road, where the original Great South Road reached the Waikato River, a  x  stockade was built in 1862 on an older pā, which probably had five terraces below the stockade. It secured the Te Ia landing place, which was used for supplies throughout the subsequent war. The site is now covered by trees.

Economy 
Construction of a large dairy factory for Yashili started in 2013 and it opened in 2015. In 2020 a court decision after an appeal allowed another dairy (milk powder) factory in Pokeno proposed by Synlait to proceed.

In 2018 it was announced that a whisky distillery was to be built in Pokeno.

A large $1-billion residential development was planned for Pokeno in 2019 but was delayed by a court case in 2021.

Demographics

Pōkeno had a population of 2,517 at the 2018 New Zealand census, an increase of 1,917 people (319.5%) since the 2013 census, and an increase of 1,947 people (341.6%) since the 2006 census. There were 792 households, comprising 1,278 males and 1,239 females, giving a sex ratio of 1.03 males per female. The median age was 33.8 years (compared with 37.4 years nationally), with 588 people (23.4%) aged under 15 years, 459 (18.2%) aged 15 to 29, 1,263 (50.2%) aged 30 to 64, and 207 (8.2%) aged 65 or older.

Ethnicities were 68.7% European/Pākehā, 15.6% Māori, 4.3% Pacific peoples, 20.9% Asian, and 3.5% other ethnicities. People may identify with more than one ethnicity.

The percentage of people born overseas was 34.7, compared with 27.1% nationally.

Although some people chose not to answer the census's question about religious affiliation, 44.8% had no religion, 34.4% were Christian, 1.8% had Māori religious beliefs, 6.1% were Hindu, 1.1% were Muslim, 1.2% were Buddhist and 3.7% had other religions.

Of those at least 15 years old, 471 (24.4%) people had a bachelor's or higher degree, and 273 (14.2%) people had no formal qualifications. The median income was $46,800, compared with $31,800 nationally. 528 people (27.4%) earned over $70,000 compared to 17.2% nationally. The employment status of those at least 15 was that 1,206 (62.5%) people were employed full-time, 231 (12.0%) were part-time, and 60 (3.1%) were unemployed.

Rural surrounds

Pōkeno Rural had a population of 1,668 at the 2018 New Zealand census, an increase of 291 people (21.1%) since the 2013 census, and an increase of 405 people (32.1%) since the 2006 census. There were 564 households, comprising 834 males and 831 females, giving a sex ratio of 1.0 males per female. The median age was 41.8 years (compared with 37.4 years nationally), with 342 people (20.5%) aged under 15 years, 261 (15.6%) aged 15 to 29, 846 (50.7%) aged 30 to 64, and 216 (12.9%) aged 65 or older.

Ethnicities were 86.3% European/Pākehā, 14.7% Māori, 4.0% Pacific peoples, 5.6% Asian, and 2.3% other ethnicities. People may identify with more than one ethnicity.

The percentage of people born overseas was 18.7, compared with 27.1% nationally.

Although some people chose not to answer the census's question about religious affiliation, 57.4% had no religion, 32.6% were Christian, 0.5% had Māori religious beliefs, 0.4% were Hindu, 0.2% were Muslim, 0.4% were Buddhist and 1.6% had other religions.

Of those at least 15 years old, 210 (15.8%) people had a bachelor's or higher degree, and 249 (18.8%) people had no formal qualifications. The median income was $43,100, compared with $31,800 nationally. 348 people (26.2%) earned over $70,000 compared to 17.2% nationally. The employment status of those at least 15 was that 798 (60.2%) people were employed full-time, 183 (13.8%) were part-time, and 33 (2.5%) were unemployed.

Education

Three schools were established in the area in the 19th century: Pokeno Hill School in 1866, a school at Pokeno Redoubt in 1870, and Pokeno Valley School in 1878. The first two schools closed in 1888–89. In 1961, the Pokeno Valley School was replaced by the current school.

In popular culture

 In the New Zealand film Goodbye Pork Pie, the fugitives steal fuel from the Pōkeno service station, now operating as a mobile home sales yard. 
 Pōkeno is well known for its two competing ice cream shops, situated on the main road, where pricing and generous scoops have created almost a cult following.
 The former Thompson Twins member Alannah Currie, who was born in Auckland, now works as an artist under the name Miss Pokeno.

References

External links

Populated places in Waikato
Waikato District